Karşıyaka İskele is a light-rail station on the Karşıyaka Tram line of the Tram İzmir system in İzmir, Turkey. It is located on Hergele Square, alongside Cemal Gürsel Avenue, next to the Karşıyaka ferry terminal and across from the southeastern end of the Karşıyaka Çarşı. East of Karşıyaka İskele, the line becomes single-track until Alaybey. The station consists of a single entrance/exit on the eastern side toward the ferry terminal. 

Karşıyaka İskele station was opened on 11 April 2017.

Connections

Paired route denotes peak/off-peak hour variation.

References

Railway stations opened in 2017
2017 establishments in Turkey
Karşıyaka District
Tram transport in İzmir